Non-citizens or non-citizen may refer to:
 Non-citizens (Latvia)
 Non-citizens (Estonia)
 Alien (law)

See also
 Citizen (disambiguation)